The Near-Earth Object Coordination Centre (NEOCC) is the main centre of the Planetary Defence Office of the European Space Agency (ESA). The NEOCC, which is based at ESRIN in Frascati, Italy, coordinates observations of small bodies such as asteroids and comets in the Solar System in order to evaluate and monitor the threat posed by those potentially hazardous.

The Coordination Centre also conducts studies with the purpose of improving near-Earth object warning services. These are necessary to give real-time alerts to different organizations, scientific bodies, and decision-makers.

References 

Planetary defense organizations